Jonathan Tiersten (born August 11, 1965) is an American actor and singer, who is mostly known for his role as Ricky Thomas in the 1983 cult classic Sleepaway Camp. He reprised the role in the 2008 sequel Return to Sleepaway Camp.

In between acting Jonathan took to music, fronting a number of bands, mostly based out of the Fort Collins, Colorado area. Tiersten is currently the lead singer of his own band, Ten Tiers and composed the score to a short starring David Krumholtz (from the TV series Numb3rs). Tiersten also starred in the 2012 film The Perfect House in which he played a serial killer named John Doesy and the upcoming (as of May 2014) thriller film Redemption which co-stars George Loros (Buffalo Ray Curto from The Sopranos) and Meredith Ostrom (Love Actually). Tiersten also composed the theme song for The Perfect House and contributed to the soundtrack of Redemption. Tiersten's 2011 EP We'll See, released by Edward Records, is his most critically acclaimed album to date, finishing third in Magnet magazine's most anticipated albums list. Shakefire.com called the album "surprising" and "simply amazing", rating it 4 out of 4 stars.

In 2012 and 2013 Tiersten garnered three best actor awards and was nominated for a fourth for his portrayal of John Doesy in The Perfect House. Tiersten also recorded a version of the (Grammy Hall of Fame) Mickey & Sylvia song "Love Is Strange" for the remake of Ed Wood's Plan 9 from Outer Space called Plan 9, starring Brian Krause (Charmed).

External links

Personal website

1965 births
American male film actors
Living people
Place of birth missing (living people)
American male singers